One of Avia's own designs, the 1930s Avia Rk.12 was a seven-cylinder radial engine with a rated output of 150 kW (200 hp), built in Czechoslovakia.

Design and development
As well as producing aircraft and building Hispano-Suiza and Lorraine aero-engines under licence, Avia also designed and built their own radial engines.  Their Rk.12 was a seven-cylinder supercharged model, rated at 200 hp.

It was a conventional air-cooled radial: nitrided steel barrels with integral fins were screwed into heat-treated Y alloy heads.  The pistons were also of heat-treated Y alloy.  The crankcase was cast from aluminium alloy, with some minor parts using magnesium alloy.  The single-throw, two-piece crankshaft was linked to the pistons with an I-section Y alloy master rod, with a single-piece big end, which carried the other six piston rods.

Applications
Avia 51

Specifications

References

1930s aircraft piston engines
Aircraft air-cooled radial piston engines